is a Japanese actress and model represented by Stardust Promotion.

Biography

Aiba debuted in the drama Tokyo Girl: Anri Okamoto in 2008. In December of the same year, she won the "Betsu Ma-Girl Audition" at the 2009 Bessatsu Margaret Quasi Grand Prix.

Aiba's first leading role was in the film Shodō Girls: AoiAoi Sora in October 2010. She was also chosen as the finalist at the non-no Model Audition 2010 for non-no.

Aiba studied for one year in the Netherlands since February 2015. Her studies were suspended due to her activities and temporarily returned in May to model for a poster of Chiba Bank.

Filmography

Films

TV drama

Radio dramas

Direct-to-video, internet drama

Variety

Advertisements

Advertising

Music videos

References

External links
 

21st-century Japanese actresses
Japanese female models
1993 births
Living people
Actors from Chiba Prefecture
Stardust Promotion artists